Chrysura refulgens is a species of cuckoo wasps (insects in the family Chrysididae).

Description
It is one of the largest South European Chrysura. Head and chest are metallic bluish, while the abdomen is metallic golden-red.

Biology
Chrysura refulgens fly from May to July. The larvae live as parasites of Osmia bicolor, Chalicodoma species and Anthidium species.

Distribution
These wasps can be found in most of Europe, in the North East and in North Africa.

References 

Chrysidinae
Insects described in 1806
Hymenoptera of Europe